Ruan High Lanes is a village west of Veryan in south Cornwall, England. The village is on the A3078 main road.

See also
Murder of Lyn Bryant – infamous unsolved murder which occurred in the town in on 20 October 1998

References

Villages in Cornwall